The Averitt-Winchester House (also known as the Lee House) is a historic house located on the west side of State Road 59, south of the Moccasin Gap-Cromartie Road junction in Miccosukee, Florida, United States. The house is locally significant in its association with post-American Civil War settlement of the area and essentially unaltered appearance.

Description and history 
The house, built c. 1881, is a one-story, gable-front-and-wing, frame vernacular building resting on brick piers. With a clapboard exterior, it has an irregular layout with two ell extensions on either side and a high-pitched tin roof pierced by two brick chimneys. the house is the oldest residence in the community, and its owners were from the earliest settler families of the area. The Averitts played an instrumental role in the founding of Indian Springs Baptist Church, providing the land for the second church building.

It was added to the U.S. National Register of Historic Places on November 15, 1996.

References

External links

 Leon County listings at National Register of Historic Places
 Leon County listings at Florida's Office of Cultural and Historical Programs

Houses on the National Register of Historic Places in Florida
Historic buildings and structures in Leon County, Florida
National Register of Historic Places in Leon County, Florida
History of Leon County, Florida
Houses in Leon County, Florida
Vernacular architecture in Florida